The 50th Infantry Division was a German division in World War II. It was formed on 26 August 1939 from the Grenzkommandantur Küstrin.

It was initially a 2nd wave division but it was later reorganized as a 1st wave division on 15 November 1939. 

The Division fought many campaigns including the invasion of Poland, Fall Gelb and the invasion of Greece. it later took part in Operation Barbarossa, fighting on the southern sector under the 11th Army. It was later destroyed in the Heiligenbeil pocket

Order of battle

1939

Infantry Regiment 121
Infantry Regiment 122
Infantry Regiment 123
Artillery Regiment 150 (2)
Engineer Battalion 71
Anti-Tank Detachment 150
Signal Detachment 71
Supply Units 354 (3)

1940
Infantry Regiment 121
Infantry Regiment 122
Infantry Regiment 123
Artillery Regiment 150
Engineer Battalion 71
Anti-Tank Detachment 150
Cycling Squadron 150
Signal Detachment 71
Supply Leader 150

1944
 Grenadier Regiment 121
 Grenadier Regiment 122
 Grenadier Regiment 123
 Fusilier Battalion 50
 Artillery Regiment 150
 Panzerjäger Detachment 150
 Field Replacement Battalion 150
 Supply Regiment 150
 Signal Detachment 150

Commanding officers
Generalleutnant Konrad Sorsche (1 September 1939 – 25 October 1940)
Generaloberst Karl-Adolf Hollidt (25 October 1940 – 23 January 1942)
Generalleutnant August Schmidt (31 January 1942 – 1 March 1942)
Generalleutnant Friedrich Schmidt (1 Mar 1942 – 26 June 1943)
Generalleutnant Friedrich Sixt (26 June 1943 – 30 April 1944)
Generalleutnant Paul Betz (30 Apr 1944 – 9 May 1944)
Generalmajor Georg Haus (5 June 1944 – 18 April 1945)
Generalmajor Kurt Domansky (18 April 1945 – 28 April 1945)
Oberst Ribbert (28 April 1945 – ? May 1945)

External links

0*050
Military units and formations established in 1939
1939 establishments in Germany
Military units and formations disestablished in 1945